Bicyclus mollitia is a butterfly in the family Nymphalidae. It is found in southern Cameroon, the Central African Republic, the southern and eastern part of the Democratic Republic of the Congo, Uganda, western Kenya and north-western Tanzania. The habitat consists of forests.

References

Elymniini
Butterflies described in 1895
Butterflies of Africa